Jean-Henri Voulland (11 October 1751, Uzès, Gard – 23 February 1801, Paris) was a politician of the French Revolution.  Originating from a Protestant family, he originally studied law.  One of his offices was as deputy for Gard in the National Convention, to which role he was elected on 5 September 1792. In September 1793 he was elected as a member of the Committee of General Security. He became part of the opposition to Robespierre and the Committee of Public Safety and played an important role in the overthrow of Robespierre on 9 Thermidor (27 July 1794).

1751 births
1801 deaths
People from Uzès
French Calvinist and Reformed Christians
Feuillants
Montagnards
Members of the National Constituent Assembly (France)
Deputies to the French National Convention
Regicides of Louis XVI
Politicians from Occitania (administrative region)
Représentants en mission
Presidents of the National Convention